The second season of RuPaul's Drag Race All Stars premiered on the Logo network on a new night; Thursday, August 25, 2016. Returning judges included RuPaul, Michelle Visage, with Carson Kressley joining the panel, while the space previously occupied by Ross Mathews was filled by Todrick Hall. Cast members were announced on June 17, 2016. This season featured ten All-Star contestants, selected from the show's second season through to its seventh season, who competed to be inducted into the "Drag Race Hall of Fame".

A new twist was revealed for this season, changing the format of the show. In previous seasons, the bottom two queens had to "Lip-sync for their Life" to avoid elimination. This season had the top two performing queens of the challenge "Lip-sync for their Legacy," with the winner of the lip-sync earning $10,000 and choosing which one of the bottom queens gets eliminated. The prizes for the winner were a one-year supply of Anastasia Beverly Hills cosmetics and a cash prize of $100,000. It is also the first All Stars season to feature Snatch Game, a challenge that debuted in the second season of the regular series.

The winner of the second season of RuPaul's Drag Race All Stars was Alaska, with Detox and Katya being the runners-up.

On May 26, 2021, it was announced that Ginger Minj would return for the sixth season of All Stars, marking the first time that an All Stars contestant (that didn’t compete on All Stars 1) came back for a second chance on All Stars.

Contestants

Ages, names, and cities stated are at time of filming.

Notes

Contestant progress

Lip syncs
Legend:

Guest judges
Listed in chronological order:

Raven-Symoné, actress, comedian, singer and model
Ross Mathews, comedian and television personality
Jeremy Scott, fashion designer
Nicole Scherzinger, singer and actress
Graham Norton, television and radio personality
Aubrey Plaza, actress and comedian

Special guests
Guests who appeared in episodes, but did not judge on the main stage:

Episode 2

Raven, runner up from season two and season one of All Stars
Jujubee, contestant from season two and season one and five of All Stars
Shangela, contestant from season two and three and season three of All Stars
Bianca Del Rio, winner of season six

Episode 4

Big Freedia, actor and singer
Victoria "Porkchop" Parker, contestant from season one

Episode 5

Chad Michaels, runner-up from season four and winner of season one of All Stars
Victoria "Porkchop" Parker, contestant from season one
Chelsea Peretti, actress and comedian
Akashia, contestant from season one
Jessica Wild, contestant from season two
Mystique Summers Madison, contestant from season two
Nicole Paige Brooks, contestant from season two
Sonique, contestant from season two and season six of All Stars
Alexis Mateo, contestant from season three and season one and five of All Stars
Mariah Paris Balenciaga, contestant from season three and season five of All Stars
Yara Sofia, contestant from season three and season one and six of All Stars
Jiggly Caliente, contestant from season four and season six of All Stars
Madame LaQueer, contestant from season four
Monica Beverly Hillz, contestant from season five
Vivienne Pinay, contestant from season five
Gia Gunn, contestant from season six and season four of All Stars
Kelly Mantle, contestant from season six
Laganja Estranja, contestant from season six
Trinity K. Bonet, contestant from season six and season six of All Stars
Vivacious, contestant on season six
Jaidynn Diore Fierce, contestant from season seven
Mrs. Kasha Davis, contestant from season seven

Episode 6

Marcus Lemonis, investor, television personality and philanthropist

Episode 7

Anastasia Soare, owner of Anastasia Beverly Hills cosmetics

Episodes

Reception
The second season of RuPaul's Drag Race All Stars was met with critical acclaim and is generally considered to be the best season in the show's history. Vox described the season as "the best — and most self-aware" season of Drag Race. Gay Times ranked it as the number-one season, specifically shouting out Alyssa Edwards and Tatianna's lipsync to "Shut Up and Drive" as a standout moment, also describing the season as having the "best cast in the show's HERstory". Elite Daily ranked it as the second-best season, behind only season four. Ryan Shea of Instinct also ranked it as the second-best season, describing Alaska's win as "triumphant". Additional praise was given to Alaska's win, with Entertainment Weekly ranking her as the third-best RuPaul's Drag Race winner, only behind Trixie Mattel and Bianca Del Rio in 2018. In a 2020 GoldDerby forum, fans voted Alaska as the favorite All Star winner, receiving over 40% of the votes.

Ratings

See also 

 List of Rusicals

References

External links

2016 American television seasons
RuPaul's Drag Race All Stars seasons
2016 in LGBT history